is the 5th studio album recorded by Japanese rock band Mr. Children, released in June 1996 under the record label Toy's Factory.

After their breakthrough in 1994, Mr. Children yielded eight consecutive chart-topping singles. Three of those hits appeared on the album; "Na mo Naki Uta", "Hana (Mémento-Mori)", and "Machine Gun o Buppanase" — while others were reserved for their subsequent release Bolero in 1997.

"deep sea"). Sakurai, who favored the sound of the phrase, decided to change the title of the album.

Shinkai was a sort of concept album, featuring more insightful compositions and harder-edged sound compared to the band's previous materials. The whole album is played gaplessly, though each tracks are separated on CD. They had not anticipated that such an adventurous effort would be a big hit.

Contrary to the group's prediction, Shinkai met with commercial success, although it underperformed its predecessor in cumulative sales. It debuted at number one on the Japanese Oricon chart with first-week sales of over 1.5 million copies, becoming the country's fastest selling album at the time. The album spent 46 weeks on the top 100, selling over 2.7 million units during its chart run. Upon its release, Shinkai was certified double-million by the Recording Industry Association of Japan, for shipments of over 2 million copies.

Track listing

Charts

Weekly charts

Year-end charts

Certifications

References

1996 albums
Mr. Children albums
Albums produced by Takeshi Kobayashi
Concept albums
Japanese-language albums